The Premio 40 Principales for Best International Album is an honor presented annually since 2012 at Los Premios 40 Principales, organised in Spain by the country's top music radio Los 40 Principales. They are considered Spain's most important music awards today.

Winners and nominees

References

Los Premios 40 Principales
Awards established in 2012
Spanish music awards